The Roman Catholic Diocese of Taichung (Lat: Dioecesis Taichungensis) is a diocese of the Latin Church of the  Roman Catholic Church in Taiwan.

Originally erected as an Apostolic Prefecture of Taichung in 1950, the Prefecture was elevated to a full diocese in 1962. The diocese is a suffragan of the Archdiocese of Taipei.

The current bishop is Martin Su Yao-wen, appointed in June 2007.

Ordinaries
William Francis Kupfer, M.M. † (26 Jan 1951 Appointed – 25 Jun 1986 Retired)
Joseph Wang Yu-jung † (25 Jun 1986 Appointed – 25 Jun 2007 Retired)
Martin Su Yao-wen (25 Jun 2007 Appointed – present)

See also

Catholic Church in Taiwan

1950 establishments in Taiwan
Organizations based in Taichung
Christian organizations established in 1950
Taichung
Roman Catholic dioceses and prelatures established in the 20th century